Asymptote is a descriptive vector graphics language — developed by Andy Hammerlindl, John C. Bowman (University of Alberta), and Tom Prince — which provides a natural coordinate-based framework for technical drawing. Asymptote runs on all major platforms (Unix, Mac OS, Microsoft Windows). It is free software, available under the terms of the GNU Lesser General Public License (LGPL).

Syntax and notable features
Asymptote typesets labels and equations with LaTeX, producing high-quality PostScript, PDF, SVG, or 3D PRC output. It is inspired by MetaPost, but has a C++-like syntax. It provides a language for typesetting mathematical figures, just as TeX/LaTeX provides a language for typesetting equations. It is mathematically oriented (e.g. rotation of vectors by complex multiplication), and uses the simplex method and deferred drawing to solve overall size constraint issues between fixed-sized objects (labels and arrowheads) and objects that should scale with figure size.

Asymptote fully generalizes MetaPost path construction algorithms to three dimensions, and compiles commands into virtual machine code for speed without sacrificing portability. High-level graphics commands are implemented in the Asymptote language itself, allowing them to be easily tailored to specific applications. It also appears to be the first software package to lift TeX into three dimensions.
This allows Asymptote to be used as a 3D vector file format. 

Asymptote is also notable for having a graphical interface coded in Python (and the Tk widget set), xasy.py — this allows an inexperienced user to quickly draw up objects and save them as .asy source code which can then be examined or edited by hand.

The program's syntax was originally described by using a Yacc compatible grammar.

Application examples
The following source code allows you to draw a graph of the Heaviside function by means of the Asymptote language.
import graph;
import settings;
outformat="pdf";

size(300,300);

// Function.
real[] x1 = {-1.5,0};
real[] y1 = {0,0};
real[] x2 = {0,1.5};
real[] y2 = {1,1};
draw(graph(x1,y1),red+2);
draw(graph(x2,y2),red+2);

draw((0,0)--(0,1),red+1.5+linetype("4 4"));
fill( circle((0,1),0.035), red);
filldraw( circle((0,0),0.03), white, red+1.5);

// Axes.
xaxis( Label("$x$"), Ticks(new real[]{-1,-0.5,0.5,1}), Arrow);
yaxis( Label("$y$"), Ticks(new real[]{0.5,1}), Arrow, ymin=-0.18, ymax=1.25);
// Origin.
labelx("$O$",0,SW);
The code above yields the following pdf output.

See also

 GeoGebra – free Dynamic Mathematics program with Asymptote export
 PSTricks
 TikZ
 PyX

References

External links
 
 Asymptote official website
 Philippe Ivaldi's extensive Asymptote gallery
 Asymptote: Art of Problem Solving Wiki
 Art of Problem Solving Forum
 Programming with Asymptote (in Dutch)
 An Asymptote Tutorial by Charles Staats

Free educational software
Free graphics software
Free plotting software
Free software programmed in C
Free software programmed in C++
Linux TeX software
TeX SourceForge projects
Vector graphics